Wimbledon Hockey Club is a field hockey club based in Wimbledon, London, England. It was established in 1883 and fields nine men's sides, seven ladies' sides as well as a comprehensive junior section. The men's 1st XI play in the Men's England Hockey League and the ladies 1st XI play in the  Women's England Hockey League.   

The club's home ground is a water based AstroTurf located at Raynes Park High School, which was built in conjunction with the school in 2019. Its clubhouse is that of the multi-sports club 'The Wimbledon Club' on Church Road, Wimbledon.

Players

Men's 1st Team Squad 2021–22 season

 (captain)

Ladies First Team Squad 2020–21 season

 (captain)

Men's Major National Honours
National Champions
 2014–15 Men's League Champions
 2015–16 Men's League Champions

Notable players

Men's internationals

 Ian Sloan
 Iain Lewers

 Gordon McIntyre

Matt Brown
Dylan Swanepoel

 Benjamin Francis
 Dominic Graham
 Peter Swainson

Women's internationals

 Rose Thomas

References

 
English field hockey clubs
Field hockey clubs established in 1883
1883 establishments in England
Field hockey in London
Wimbledon, London